ACE Electric Vehicle Group Pty Ltd is an Australian automobile manufacturer of electric cars and vans based in Maryborough, Queensland.

History
The ACE EV Group startup was founded in 2017 by Australian engineer Gregory McGarvie and Chinese entrepreneur Will Qiang, with the small town of Maryborough in Queensland in the northeast of the country as its headquarters.

The goal was to develop the domestic production of electric cars in the form of small, city vans aimed at small entrepreneurs. The company name is an acronym from the words Australian Clean Energy Electric Vehicle, with the logo incorporating one of Australia's informal symbols, the kangaroo.

In 2018, ACE EV was awarded the MTAiQ Innovation Award in the State of Queensland, Australia

In August 2019, ACE EV unveiled a complete range of electric vehicles consisting of a Cargo van and a Yewt pickup, as well as the Urban compact 3-door hatchback. Sales of vehicles on the Australian market are expected to start in 2021.

In September 2020, ACE EV Partnered with SenSen Networks to begin development of an Autonomous EV Solution in Australia

Vehicles 
 Urban
 Yewt
 Cargo
 V1 Transformer

References

External links 
 

Car brands
Car manufacturers of Australia
Electric vehicle manufacturers of Australia
Australian companies established in 2017
Vehicle manufacturing companies established in 2017
Companies based in Queensland
Maryborough, Queensland